Henri Arends (8 May 1921 – 6 August 1994) was a Dutch conductor.

Arends was born in Maastricht, and belongs to the generation of conductors who paid as much attention to modern music as to that of the classic and romantic periods.

Originally a violinist, he attended the courses for conductors at the Mozarteum of Salzburg under Carlo Zecchi and at the Accademia Chigiana in Siena under Paul van Kempen.

Already in that time he achieved notice for his mature interpretations and for his exceptional musical memory. Wilhelm Furtwängler, the great German conductor, who saw him working with the Mozarteum Orchestra predicted him a brilliant career.

From 1953 until 1957, he was assistant and later second conductor of the Royal Concertgebouw Orchestra, under first conductor Eduard van Beinum, in Amsterdam and choirmaster of the Toonkunst-choir.

It was as first conductor and musical director of the North Holland Philharmonic that he attracted attention for his completely fresh approach to a vast repertoire and for his highly original efforts to attract new audiences to the concert hall. among these successful enterprises was the formation of the famous "Heart's Desires Festivals", which were aimed at young people.

As guest conductor, Arends performed at many concerts in his country and abroad.

He conducted a.o. the radio-orchestras of Hilversum, Paris, Helsinki, Nice and Geneva; the FOK-orchestra of Prag, the Philharmonics of Brno, Ostrawa, Kraków, Lodz, Katowice, Danzig, Budapest, Innsbruck, Osnabrück, Aachen and the Salzburg Mozarteum orchestra. He also appeared with orchestras in South-Africa (Cape Town and Johannesburg) and with orchestras in the United States (New York and Baton rouge). He died in Lanaken.

Publications 
 Jozef Robijns, Miep Zijlstra: Algemene muziekencyclopedie, Haarlem: De Haan, (1979)-1984, 
 John L.  Holmes: Conductors on record, London: Victor Gollancz, 1982. 

1921 births
1994 deaths
Dutch conductors (music)
Male conductors (music)
Musicians from Maastricht
Mozarteum University Salzburg alumni
20th-century conductors (music)
20th-century Dutch male musicians